"Shut Up" (stylized in all-caps) is a song by American rapper DaBaby, released as a single on February 6, 2020.

Background 
The song talks about DaBaby's haters talking bad about him, which is resulting in him telling them to shut up in the song. It brings up his lawsuits as well. He brings up the fact where he was seen "assaulting" a hotel worker after recording him with his two-year-old daughter without their permission, even after DaBaby denied it and respectfully explained to him that it would compromise the safety of his child.

The song is produced by DJ K.i.D, who also produced DaBaby's "Intro". A line in the first verse makes a reference to American rapper Kevin Gates, who was featured on DaBaby's "Pop Star" from his second studio album, Kirk (2019).

Release 
Although the song was released on February 6, 2020, on DaBaby's YouTube channel, the track was officially uploaded to all streaming services on February 12, 2020, but was listed under the release date as being released on February 6, 2020.

Critical reception 
Mitch Findlay of HotNewHipHop said that the track was a "banger", and that DaBaby "goes off".

Music video 
The music video was released on February 6, 2020. It shows DaBaby hanging out on Super Bowl weekend for Super Bowl LIV, and features clips with American rappers Diddy and Kanye West "to help him celebrate DaBaby's success. The video, directed by Reel Goats, was shot in Miami, Florida, where Super Bowl LIV, the 54th Super Bowl, was played by the Kansas City Chiefs and San Francisco 49ers.

Notes

References 

2020 singles
2020 songs
DaBaby songs
Songs written by DaBaby
Interscope Records singles